Ralston Dam (National ID # CO00205) is a dam in Jefferson County, Colorado.

The earthen dam was constructed in 1937 by the Denver Board Of Water Commissioners, with a height of 204 feet, and a length of 1170 feet at its crest.  It impounds Ralston Creek for municipal water supply for the city of Denver.  The dam is owned and operated by the Denver Board Of Water Commissioners.

The reservoir it creates, Ralston Reservoir, has a normal water surface of 160 acres, has a maximum capacity of 15,900 acre-feet, and a normal capacity of 13,200 acre-feet. In 2010 officials discovered that the defunct Schwartzwalder uranium mine was contaminating groundwater near the reservoir, threatening the Denver water supply with concentrations of uranium some 1000 times the human health standard. The owners of the mine, Cotter Corp., rerouted the Ralston Creek around the mine site after uranium levels of between 40 and 50 parts per billion were discovered in the creek, greater than the 30 ppb federal drinking water standard. Cotter hopes the rerouting will be temporary while it cleans the contaminated mine using bioremediation.

References 

Dams in Colorado
Reservoirs in Colorado
United States local public utility dams
Dams completed in 1937
Buildings and structures in Jefferson County, Colorado
Bodies of water of Jefferson County, Colorado